Bala Marznak (also Romanized as Bālā Marznāk) is a village in Gatab-e Jonubi Rural District, Gatab District, Babol County, Mazandaran Province, Iran. At the 2006 census, its population was 886, in 220 families.

References 

Populated places in Babol County